Bluefield High School (BHS) is a Canadian secondary school in Hampshire, Prince Edward Island for students from the Mid-part of Queens County, including the town of Cornwall.

The school is administratively part of the Public Schools Branch. Its official colours are blue and white and the mascot is a Bobcat. The sports teams from BHS are called the Bluefield Bobcats.

History and characteristics
In 2000, a new $2 million addition to Bluefield High School was opened by students, staff, parents, Eastern School District representatives and government officials. It consists of seven classrooms, one special education area, a sick room, an art room, two work rooms, a general office area and a new main entrance area. The Honourable Jeffrey E. Lantz, Minister of Education, also participated in the official opening.
In 2007, Bluefield was one of three Island schools, and one of ten Canadian schools, to receive a $40,000 HP grant to improve teaching by using technology. The grant was used to enhance teaching math and science at Bluefield. A team of five Bluefield teachers applied for the grant earlier that year.
In 2010, BHS put on an open house of readings at the Confederation Centre Art Gallery by the Creative Writing Group of Bluefield High School led by Yvette Doucette.

The high school offers both French and English languages.

Facilities

The school's $40,000 HP grant in 2008 allowed the school to install some of the following features:
A large library and resource centre with an adjoining seminar and meeting rooms.
The cafetorium with a large stage, prop area, and sound and lighting room.
Band and music room.
A kitchen.
Trades training spaces for carpentry, welding, motor vehicle repair and applied technology.
SmartBoards and accompanying technology for classrooms.
One classroom has a wall made of thick see-through glass.
Two computer labs.
A  gymnasium and an auxiliary gym above it.

School sports

Sports at Bluefield High Include:

boys and girls Basketball
boys and girls Rugby
boys and girls Cross Country
boys and girls Soccer
boys and girls Softball
boys and girls Track & Field
boys and girls Golf
boys and girls Badminton
boys and girls Volleyball
boys and girls Powerlifting
girls Field Hockey

Sports tournaments

The Snowbird Classic
A basketball tournament hosted in December by Bluefield High which draws schools competing from across P.E.I., New Brunswick and Nova Scotia.

The annual teams are the Bluefield Bobcats, the Rural Raiders, the Colonel Gray Colonels, the Three Oaks Axemen, the Tantramar Titans and the Sackville Kingfishers.

Bluefield Invitational Hockey Tournament
In 2012 Bluefield High School and the school's Parent Advisory Council decided to have a fundraising hockey tournament in rinks in Kensington, Montague and Charlottetown. The round-robin tournament featured four female teams and five male teams from the high schools of Evangeline High, Kinkora High, Bluefield High, Colonel Gray Sr. High, Montague High and Souris High.

This was the first time that high school hockey has been played on PEI since 1989 when Bluefield won the provincial title. Funds went to support the Breakfast Program, band, Jo-bo Fitness and sports teams at Bluefield.

Clubs at Bluefield
Outdoor Adventure Club
Yearbook Committee
Chess Club
Science Club
Junior Achievement
Rotary Youth Parliament
SADD
PURPLE
Art Club
Nap Club
Anime Club
Travel Club
Drama Club
Improv Club

Notable alumni
 Adam McQuaid, hockey player
 Jared Connaughton, Olympic sprinter

See also
List of schools in Prince Edward Island
List of school districts in Prince Edward Island

References

External links
 Home Page

High schools in Prince Edward Island
Schools in Queens County, Prince Edward Island
Educational institutions established in 1968
1968 establishments in Prince Edward Island